Events from the year 1552 in Ireland.

Incumbent
Monarch: Edward VI

Events
January – James Croft, Lord Deputy of Ireland, is commissioned to look into the state of mining in Ireland.
February 2 – The office of Ulster King of Arms and Principal Herald of Ireland is established (based at Dublin Castle) by King Edward VI of England.
June 7 – The king orders the Irish currency to be reduced to parity with that of England.
c. July – James Croft campaigns in Clandeboye; Belfast Castle is taken.
October 22 – John Bale is nominated Bishop of Ossory.
October 28 – Hugh Goodacre is nominated Archbishop of Armagh by the king, the Catholic George Dowdall being deemed to have vacated the episcopal see.
December 4 – Croft leaves Ireland; Sir Thomas Cusack and Sir Gerald Aylmer, Lord Justices, serve in his place.

Births
Approximate date –   Edmund FitzGibbon, the White Knight (d. 1608)

Deaths
July 9 – Sir William Brabazon, Lord Justice of Ireland.
Patrick Barnewall, Master of the Rolls in Ireland (b. c.1500)

References

 
1550s in Ireland
Ireland
Years of the 16th century in Ireland